Christopher Hals Gylseth (born 5 July 1965) is a Norwegian author. He studied history of ideas and has written many biographies of Norwegian people, amongst them Ola Thommessen, Elling M. Solheim and Øvre Richter Frich.

References

1965 births
Living people
Norwegian biographers
Norwegian male writers
Male biographers